Poropuntius is a genus of cyprinid fish found mainly in freshwater habitats of Southeast Asia and Yunnan in China, but P. burtoni is from South Asia. Several species have highly restricted ranges and are threatened, and a single P. speleops is a cavefish.

Species
There are currently 38 recognized species in this genus:

 Poropuntius alloiopleurus (Vaillant, 1893)
 Poropuntius angustus Kottelat, 2000
 Poropuntius bantamensis (Rendahl (de), 1920)
 Poropuntius bolovenensis T. R. Roberts, 1998
 Poropuntius brevispinus (V. H. Nguyễn & L. H. Doan, 1969)
 Poropuntius burtoni (Mukerji, 1933)
 Poropuntius carinatus (H. W. Wu & R. D. Lin, 1977)
 Poropuntius chondrorhynchus (Fowler, 1934)
 Poropuntius chonglingchungi (T. L. Tchang, 1938)
 Poropuntius cogginii (B. L. Chaudhuri, 1911)
 Poropuntius consternans Kottelat, 2000
 Poropuntius daliensis (H. W. Wu & R. D. Lin, 1977)
 Poropuntius deauratus (Valenciennes, 1842)
 Poropuntius exiguus (H. W. Wu & R. D. Lin, 1977)
 Poropuntius faucis (H. M. Smith, 1945)
 Poropuntius fuxianhuensis (Y. H. Wang, D. D. Zhuang & L. C. Gao, 1982)
 Poropuntius genyognathus T. R. Roberts, 1998
 Poropuntius hampaloides (Vinciguerra, 1890)
 Poropuntius hathe T. R. Roberts, 1998
 Poropuntius heterolepidotus T. R. Roberts, 1998
 Poropuntius huangchuchieni (T. L. Tchang, 1962)
 Poropuntius kontumensis (Chevey, 1934)
 Poropuntius krempfi (Pellegrin & Chevey, 1934)
 Poropuntius laoensis (Günther, 1868)
 Poropuntius lobocheiloides Kottelat, 2000
 Poropuntius margarianus (J. Anderson, 1879)
 Poropuntius melanogrammus T. R. Roberts, 1998
 Poropuntius normani H. M. Smith, 1931
 Poropuntius opisthoptera (H. W. Wu, 1977)
 Poropuntius rhomboides (H. W. Wu & R. D. Lin, 1977)
 Poropuntius scapanognathus T. R. Roberts, 1998
 Poropuntius schanicus (Boulenger, 1893)
 Poropuntius shanensis (Hora & Mukerji, 1934)
 Poropuntius smedleyi (de Beaufort, 1933)
 Poropuntius solitus Kottelat, 2000
 Poropuntius speleops (T. R. Roberts, 1991)
 Poropuntius susanae (Banister, 1973)
 Poropuntius tawarensis (M. C. W. Weber & de Beaufort, 1916)

References 

 
Cyprinidae genera
Cyprinid fish of Asia
Taxonomy articles created by Polbot